Wilcza Góra  is a village in the administrative district of Gmina Przystajń, within Kłobuck County, Silesian Voivodeship, in southern Poland.

The village has a population of 96. Despite having a small shop in the past; as of 2022 there are no stores, churches, or other services in the village.

References

Villages in Kłobuck County